Roope Gröndahl (born in Helsinki, 1989) is a Finnish pianist trained at the Sibelius Academy under Matti Raekallio and Liisa Pohjola.

Competition Record
 2007 Helsinki Maj Lind IPC - 2nd prize
 2008 Eurovision Young Musicians - 2nd prize

More information
  Profile on Comusico
 KlangKultTour 2009

References
 European Union of Music Competition for the Youth
 2008 Eurovision Young Musicians
 Helsinki Maj Lind International Piano Competition

1989 births
Living people
Finnish classical pianists
Eurovision Young Musicians Finalists
21st-century classical pianists